Bear Grove Township is one of twenty townships in Fayette County, Illinois, USA.  As of the 2010 census, its population was 599 and it contained 259 housing units.  The township was originally known as Johnson Township.

Geography

Unincorporated towns
 Hagarstown

Extinct towns
 Jimtown

Cemeteries
The township contains these five cemeteries: Bethlehem, Eakle, Evans, McInturff and Wright and Neathery.

Major highways
  Interstate 70
  U.S. Route 40
  Illinois Route 140

Airports and landing strips
 Lutz Airport
 Vandalia Municipal Airport

Lakes
 Vandalia Lake

Demographics

School districts
 Mulberry Grove Community Unit School District 1
 Vandalia Community Unit School District 203

Political districts
 Illinois' 19th congressional district
 State House District 102
 State Senate District 51

References
 
 United States Census Bureau 2007 TIGER/Line Shapefiles
 United States National Atlas

External links
 City-Data.com
 Illinois State Archives

Townships in Fayette County, Illinois
1859 establishments in Illinois
Populated places established in 1859
Townships in Illinois